Homalopoma luridum, with the common name: Dall's dwarf turban, is a species of small sea snail with calcareous opercula, a marine gastropod mollusk in the family Colloniidae.

Description
The height of the shell varies between 6 mm and 10 mm. Its color is red, ashen or purple. The small, globose shell is very solid and imperforate. The spire is conic, more or less depressed. The suture is moderately impressed. There are five whorls. These are slightly convex, the last decidedly deflected toward the aperture, encircled by about fifteen subequal spiral lirae, separated by interstices about as wide as the ridges. The incremental striae are generally strongly developed, causing the liree to appear nodose or somewhat irregular, and the interstices to appear pitted. The oblique aperture is pearly white within. It measures about half the length of shell. The columella is arcuate. The base of the shell is obsoletely uni- bi- or tri-dentate. The rounded oval operculum is nearly smooth and slightly concave in the middle.

Distribution
This species occurs in abundant numbers in the Pacific Ocean under rocks and an shale at low tide from Sitka, Alaska to Northern Baja California, Mexico.

References

External links
 To Biodiversity Heritage Library (3 publications)
 To Encyclopedia of Life
 To USNM Invertebrate Zoology Mollusca Collection
 To ITIS
 To World Register of Marine Species
 

Colloniidae
Gastropods described in 1885